The R257 road is a regional road in Ireland, located in County Donegal. It is a scenic route, skirting around the edge of the Bloody Foreland.

References

Regional roads in the Republic of Ireland
Roads in County Donegal